Universities in Canada are established and operate under provincial and territorial government charters, except in one case directed by First Nations bands and in another by federal legislation. Most public universities in the country are members of Universities Canada (formerly the Association of Universities and Colleges of Canada (AUCC)). The title "university" is protected under federal regulation.

Governance

Degree course 
, there are 97 universities in Canada, offering education in English and French. Most French-speaking universities are located in Quebec, though  outside the province are either francophone or bilingual. 1.8 million students are enrolled in university. Programs are offered to graduating high school students through choice; however, students must maintain specific entering averages, which generally range from 65 to 85%, depending on criteria set by the chosen university. On campus residences are available at 95% of universities in Canada. Most include a meal plan and general utilities. Residence is optional at all post-secondary campuses.

Degree programs generally last three to four years, though some programs may take longer to complete due to cooperative education (Co-op) programs or joint programs with colleges which are touted for offering practical experience. Tuition is based on program material and content, which vary in price. For many programs, more general courses will be taken in first year while "program specific courses" begin in year two. Some universities such as University of Toronto require admission separate from initial admission from high school into specific programs based on internal standards achieved in first year (i.e. a set grade point average). Higher education institutions in Canada are prevented from becoming diploma mills by provincial/territorial legislation and regulation.

Universities by province and territory

Alberta 

Post-secondary education in Alberta is regulated by the Ministry of Advanced Education. There are eight public universities in Alberta, ten public colleges, three polytechnical institutes (which grant degrees), and seven private colleges (all of which grant degrees). Most private universities refer to themselves as "university colleges", and they grant equivalent degrees.  One university, University nuhelotʼįne thaiyotsʼį nistameyimâkanak Blue Quills, is governed not under provincial legislation, but controlled directly by a consortium of seven First Nations band governments.

Edmonton, the province's capital city, is home to the University of Alberta, the province's oldest and largest university; MacEwan University; The King's University; and Concordia University of Edmonton (not to be confused with Concordia University of Montreal). The French-language Campus Saint-Jean is part of the University of Alberta, offering programmes to francophone and francophile students.

There are five universities in Calgary: the University of Calgary, Ambrose University, Mount Royal University, St. Mary's University and the Alberta University of the Arts.

The University of Lethbridge is based out of Lethbridge but also has a campus in Calgary.

Athabasca University, a distance learning university, has been based out of Athabasca since 1970.

Established in 1907 in Leduc, the independent publicly funded Burman University in Lacombe is the oldest university in Alberta. Formerly a university college, the Alberta Government granted the institution permission to change its status from "university college" to "university" in 2014.

In 2009, a bill was passed by the Alberta legislature which allowed the two public colleges that offered degrees (MacEwan College in Edmonton and Mount Royal College in Calgary) to change their status to universities. Mount Royal College was renamed Mount Royal University on September 3, 2009 and Grant MacEwan College became Grant MacEwan University on September 24, 2009 (renamed MacEwan University in September 2013).

In 2015 The King's University College (originally The King's College) was renamed The King's University, and Concordia University College of Alberta (originally Concordia College) was renamed Concordia University of Edmonton.

British Columbia 

There are eleven public universities and five private universities in British Columbia.

Eight universities are in the Metro Vancouver region which is the most populated region of British Columbia, including Capilano University, Emily Carr University of Art and Design, University of the Fraser Valley, Kwantlen Polytechnic University, Trinity Western University, Simon Fraser University, the University Canada West and the University of British Columbia  (with the exception of the University of British Columbia Okanagan, the major UBC campus located in the Okanagan Valley).

Three universities are on Vancouver Island including Vancouver Island University, Royal Roads University and the University of Victoria. The University of Northern British Columbia houses a main campus in Prince George, with regional campuses in Quesnel, Terrace and Fort St. John.

Three public universities, Capilano University, University of the Fraser Valley and Kwantlen Polytechnic University, along with the private Quest University Canada, are primarily undergraduate institutions.

Two US-based private university campuses in Vancouver, namely the New York Institute of Technology and Fairleigh Dickinson University, both are in Vancouver, primarily for undergraduate and graduate students.

Online and distance education
The biggest provider of online and distance education in BC is Thompson Rivers University, Open Learning. With over 400 individual courses and more than 57 programs available for completion by distance and online learning, students can take a variety of programs such as: adult secondary school completion; certificates and diplomas, including advanced and post-baccalaureate; associate degrees; and bachelor's degrees. Considering distance students, Thompson Rivers University's enrolment is 22,036 (8964 of which is distance).

Oldest BC university

The oldest university in the province is the University of British Columbia, established in 1908, with its newest major campus in Okanagan established in 2005. Five institutions in British Columbia were officially designated as universities on September 1, 2008: Capilano University, Emily Carr University of Art and Design, Kwantlen Polytechnic University, the University of the Fraser Valley, and Vancouver Island University. University enrolment in British Columbia ranges from Quest University Canada with 700 students to the University of British Columbia with 45,484 students.

Manitoba 

There are five public universities and one private university in Manitoba, which are under the responsibility of the Ministry of Advanced Education and Literacy. Three of the public universities—the University of Manitoba, which is the oldest university in western Canada, the University of Winnipeg, and Université de Saint-Boniface—are in Winnipeg, the capital and largest city in the province. Université de Saint-Boniface, established in 1818, is the oldest post-secondary institute in the province and is the only French-language university in western Canada. Brandon University is located in the western Manitoba city of Brandon. Canadian Mennonite University is a private Anabaptist university in Winnipeg.

The province also has three university colleges: Booth University College, formed in 1982 in Winnipeg, Providence University College in Otterburne, Manitoba, and the University College of the North, which serves the communities of The Pas and Thompson. Smaller satellite campuses serve 12 other smaller centers, 9 of which are on First Nations land.

University enrolment in Manitoba ranges from Booth University College with several hundred students to the University of Manitoba with 26,800 students.

New Brunswick 

There are eight chartered universities in New Brunswick; four public universities, governed by the Ministry of Post-Secondary Education, Training and Labour, and four private institutions including an online university, Yorkville University. New Brunswick holds the distinctions of having the first English-language university in Canada and the first public university in North America, (the University of New Brunswick); and also the first university in the British Empire to award a bachelor's degree to a woman, (Mount Allison University) in 1875. St. Thomas University and University of New Brunswick have campuses in the province's capital of Fredericton and UNB also maintains a campus in Saint John. Established in 1785, the University of New Brunswick is the oldest public in the province, and the Université de Moncton is the newest, formed in 1963, though dating back to 1864 through one of its three predecessor institutions. Public university enrolment ranges from Mount Allison University with 2,486 students to the University of New Brunswick with 10,587 students. Of the three private universities, Crandall University has an enrollment 800. Another private university, St. Stephen's University is located in St. Stephen, NB. Kingswood University is an evangelical Christian University associated with the Wesleyan Church, located in Sussex, New Brunswick, Canada.

Newfoundland and Labrador 

The Degree Granting Act of Newfoundland and Labrador regulates degree-granting universities in the province. The only university in Newfoundland and Labrador, Memorial University of Newfoundland, has campuses in three cities, in St. John's, the capital of Newfoundland and Labrador, on the west coast of the province, in Corner Brook, and in Harlow, U.K. With 18,172 enrolled students, it is the second largest university in Atlantic Canada.

Nova Scotia 

There are 10 universities in Nova Scotia. Six of these – Atlantic School of Theology, Dalhousie University, Mount Saint Vincent University, the NSCAD University, Saint Mary's University, and the University of King's College – are located in Halifax, Nova Scotia, the provincial capital and largest city in Atlantic Canada. The oldest university in the province is the University of King's College, established in 1789, while the newest is Cape Breton University, established in 1974. University student enrolment in Nova Scotia ranges from 150 students at Atlantic School of Theology to more than 18,000 at Dalhousie University.

Several universities in Nova Scotia have religious connections. The University of King's College, founded in Windsor, was the first college to obtain university powers in British North America, at a time when Upper Canada had no government of its own. It has always remained under the control of the Church of England. Dalhousie University, originally known as Dalhousie College, was established in Halifax in 1818 with the help of the Presbyterian Church, and Acadia University was founded by Baptists. Catholics formed Saint Mary's University, Mount Saint Vincent University, and Saint Francis Xavier University.

Université Sainte-Anne, the tenth university, is located in Pointe-de-l'Église and instructs its academic courses in French.

Ontario 

There are 22 publicly funded universities in the Canadian province of Ontario that are post-secondary education institutions with degree-granting authority. Each of these institutions were either established through an Act of the Legislative Assembly or through a royal charter. With the exception of Royal Military College of Canada, students apply to public universities in Ontario through the Ontario Universities' Application Centre.

Ontario also has 24 publicly funded colleges, most referred to as Colleges of Applied Arts and Technology and five as Institutes of Technology and Advanced Learning, all of which are commonly referred to as colleges. Twelve colleges offered 74 bachelor's degree programmes, –13.

The University of Toronto was established in 1827 making it the oldest university in Ontario. The newest university in Ontario is the Université de l'Ontario français, incorporated by legislation in 2018 but accepting its first cohort of full-time students in 2021. The next newest, Algoma University, was established in 2008 after gaining independence from Laurentian University. The largest university in terms of enrolment is the University of Toronto, which has 84,000 students across campuses in three locations. York University in Toronto has over 50,000 students, the second largest university in terms of enrolment. The U15 Group of Canadian Research Universities is headquartered in Ottawa.

Prince Edward Island 

There is one university in Prince Edward Island that is authorized to grant degrees. Higher education in the province falls under the jurisdiction of the Higher Education and Corporate Services Branch within the Department of Education and Early Childhood Development. The only university in the province, the University of Prince Edward Island, is in the province's capital of Charlottetown. The institution resulted from an amalgamation of Prince of Wales College, a former university college founded in 1834, and Saint Dunstan's University, founded in 1855. UPEI hosts the Atlantic Veterinary College, funded by the four Atlantic provincial governments.

In Maclean's 2023 Guide to Canadian Universities, UPEI was ranked eighth in the publication's category for "primarily undergraduate" Canadian universities.

Quebec 

There are 19 universities in the largely French-speaking province of Quebec, 10 of which form the Université du Québec network.

In Québec, universities are independent from government and autonomous in managing their affairs. By means of legislation or constitutional charters, lawmakers have granted each university the freedom to define its own curriculum and develop its own teaching and research programs. The university has full responsibility for setting admission standards and enrolment requirements, awarding degrees and recruiting its personnel.

Of the nineteen universities, three are anglophone: Concordia University, McGill University and Bishop's University. One, the Royal Military College Saint-Jean, is bilingual (between French and English). The rest are francophone: five of them – École de technologie supérieure, Polytechnique Montréal, HEC Montréal, Université de Montréal and Université du Québec à Montréal – are located in Montreal, the most populated city in Quebec, and four of them – École nationale d'administration publique, Institut national de la recherche scientifique, TÉLUQ and Université Laval – are based in Quebec City, the province's capital. The Institut national de la recherche scientifique and École nationale d'administration publique do not offer undergraduate level programs, while TÉLUQ is a distance learning university.

The oldest university in the province is Université Laval, established in 1663. The most recent institutions are: Université du Québec en Abitibi-Témiscamingue (1983), Concordia University (1974), École de technologie supérieure (1974), TÉLUQ (1972, merged with UQÀM in 2005, split in 2012). University enrolment in the province of Quebec ranges from the Institut national de la recherche scientifique with 480 students to the Université de Montréal with 55,540 students (but this figure actually includes HEC and Polytechnique, which are legally distinct universities).

Saskatchewan 

There are two universities in Saskatchewan with degree-granting authority. The Government of Saskatchewan must establish statutes individually to degree-granting universities; these statutes outline the authority of each institution, their regulations, and bylaws. The University of Regina is based Regina, the province's capital, and the University of Saskatchewan is in Saskatoon, the most populous city in Saskatchewan. The University of Saskatchewan is the oldest university in the province, founded in 1907. The University of Saskatchewan is also the largest university in Saskatchewan with 18,620 students, and the First Nations University of Canada (FNUC) is the smallest with 840 students. The First Nations University of Canada is another post-secondary institution that is federated with the University of Regina, and caters to the needs of First Nations students. It was originally called the Federation of Saskatchewan Indian Nations, and once formed, it entered into a federated agreement with the University of Regina to create the Saskatchewan Indian Federated College (SIFC). This Agreement allowed FNUC to become an independently administered university-college that served First Nations students. The First Nations University of Canada is the only university in the province that does not offer graduate-level programs.

Yukon 

Yukon University (formerly Yukon College) is a public university in the Canadian territory of Yukon. Although the institution also operates 12 campuses throughout the territory, its main campus is based in Whitehorse. Initially built as a Canadian college, Yukoners had proposed the Yukon college become a university in some form or other since 2004. In December, 2019, the Yukon Legislative Assembly passed a bill that would transform Yukon College into Yukon University. The university officially opened in May 2020, making Yukon University the only public university in northern Canada.

List of public universities 
There are many public universities in Canada that are authorized to issue degrees. Degrees from Affiliated institutions and seminaries are typically awarded by the affiliate's parent institution.

List of private universities 

The following is a list of private universities that are authorized to issue degrees by a provincial authority. The following list does not include satellite campuses and branches in Canada for universities based in the United States. All of them are English language institutions.

See also 
U15 (universities)
Higher education in Canada
List of business schools in Canada
List of Canadian universities by endowment
List of colleges in Canada
List of law schools in Canada
List of universities and colleges by country
Lists of universities and colleges
List of unaccredited institutions of higher learning
Rankings of universities in Canada

Notes

Footnotes

References

External links 
 Association of Universities and Colleges of Canada
 Map of all Canadian Universities
Times Higher Education Canadian University rankings

Lists of universities and colleges by country